Hyalurga leucophaea is a moth of the family Erebidae. It was described by Francis Walker in 1854. It is found in Venezuela and Peru.

Subspecies
Hyalurga leucophaea leucophaea (Venezuela)
Hyalurga leucophaea gabrielis Bryk, 1953 (Peru)

References

Hyalurga
Moths described in 1854